CHTC Bonluck Bus Co., Ltd., trading as Bonluck Bus, is a bus manufacturer based in Nanchang, Jiangxi, China.  It is a government-owned enterprise, and since 2010 has been part of the CHTC conglomerate. Bonluck can build up to 5,000 buses and coaches a year.  The buses have been sold around the world including Australia, Europe and the Americas.

Models
Bonluck JXK6840 bus
Bonluck JXK6145XR Coach
Bonluck JXK6128CR Coach
Bonluck JXK6960CR Coach
Bonluck JXK6850CR Coach
Bonluck JXK6790CR Coach
Bonluck JXK6137 Coach
Bonluck JXK6850DR Coach
Bonluck JXK6105DR Coach
Bonluck JXK6127DR Coach
Bonluck JXK6126XR Coach
Bonluck JXK6960G City bus
Bonluck JXK6116 City bus
Bonluck JXK6120 City bus
Bonluck JXK6601 Electric bus
Bonluck Luxury Motorhome
Bonluck JXK6105 Motorhome

Gallery

References

External links
Bonluck Bus webpage

Bus manufacturers of China
Companies based in Jiangxi
Chinese brands